Valley Acres is a census-designated place (CDP) in Kern County, California, United States. The population was 527 at the 2010 census, up from 512 at the 2000 census.

Geography

History
The community was founded in 1937.

Demographics

2010
At the 2010 census Valley Acres had a population of 527. The racial makeup of Valley Acres was 428 (81.2%) White, 1 (0.2%) African American, 10 (1.9%) Native American, 1 (0.2%) Asian, 0 (0.0%) Pacific Islander, 42 (8.0%) from other races, and 45 (8.5%) from two or more races. Hispanic or Latino of any race were 121 people (23.0%).

The whole population lived in households, no one lived in non-institutionalized group quarters and no one was institutionalized.

There were 175 households, 59 (33.7%) had children under the age of 18 living in them, 103 (58.9%) were opposite-sex married couples living together, 17 (9.7%) had a female householder with no husband present, 16 (9.1%) had a male householder with no wife present.  There were 14 (8.0%) unmarried opposite-sex partnerships, and 1 (0.6%) same-sex married couples or partnerships. 34 households (19.4%) were one person and 12 (6.9%) had someone living alone who was 65 or older. The average household size was 3.01.  There were 136 families (77.7% of households); the average family size was 3.38.

The age distribution was 134 people (25.4%) under the age of 18, 64 people (12.1%) aged 18 to 24, 99 people (18.8%) aged 25 to 44, 155 people (29.4%) aged 45 to 64, and 75 people (14.2%) who were 65 or older.  The median age was 39.8 years. For every 100 females, there were 105.1 males.  For every 100 females age 18 and over, there were 111.3 males.

There were 193 housing units at an average density of 46.8 per square mile, of the occupied units 137 (78.3%) were owner-occupied and 38 (21.7%) were rented. The homeowner vacancy rate was 1.4%; the rental vacancy rate was 5.0%.  379 people (71.9% of the population) lived in owner-occupied housing units and 148 people (28.1%) lived in rental housing units.

2000
At the 2000 census there were 512 people, 183 households, and 144 families living in the CDP. The racial makeup of the CDP was 89.84% White, 0.59% Black or African American, 1.76% Native American, 0.20% Asian, 0.59% Pacific Islander, 4.69% from other races, and 2.34% from two or more races.  7.42% of the population were Hispanic or Latino of any race.
Of the 183 households 35.5% had children under the age of 18 living with them, 67.2% were married couples living together, 6.6% had a female householder with no husband present, and 21.3% were non-families. 18.0% of households were one person and 8.2% were one person aged 65 or older.  The average household size was 2.80 and the average family size was 3.18.

The age distribution was 30.3% under the age of 18, 5.3% from 18 to 24, 26.2% from 25 to 44, 28.1% from 45 to 64, and 10.2% 65 or older.  The median age was 38 years. For every 100 females, there were 109.0 males.  For every 100 females age 18 and over, there were 108.8 males.

The median household income was $41,477 and the median family income  was $48,958. Males had a median income of $36,513 versus $45,357 for females. The per capita income for the CDP was $18,013.  About 5.1% of families and 8.2% of the population were below the poverty line, including none of those under age 18 and 8.5% of those age 65 or over.

References

Census-designated places in Kern County, California
Populated places established in 1937
1937 establishments in California
Census-designated places in California